Madeleine Allakariallak (born Resolute, Nunavut) is a Canadian Inuit musician and television journalist. Formerly a member of the Inuit throat singing duo Tudjaat, from 2005 to 2007 she was also the host of the weekly newsmagazine series APTN National News Contact on the Aboriginal Peoples Television Network.

Phoebe Atagotaaluk, Allakariallak's bandmate in Tudjaat, is her cousin.  Her husband, Romeyn Stevenson, is a current member of the Iqaluit City Council.

See also

Music of Canada
Aboriginal music of Canada
List of Canadian musicians

References
Citations

Year of birth missing (living people)
Living people
People from Resolute
Canadian folk singers
Canadian women folk singers
Inuit musicians
Musicians from Nunavut
Canadian television reporters and correspondents
Canadian women television journalists
21st-century Canadian journalists
Canadian Inuit women
21st-century Canadian women singers
Inuit from the Northwest Territories
Inuit from Nunavut